Alexander Edmondson (born 22 December 1993) is an Australian road and track cyclist, who currently rides for UCI WorldTeam . Edmondson was a member of the Australian Olympic Track Cycling team at the 2012 London Olympics, alongside his sister, Annette Edmondson. In 2014 he was world champion in the individual pursuit. He won the silver medal in the team pursuit at the 2016 Summer Olympics in Rio de Janeiro.

Early life and amateur career
Edmondson was born above a Chinese coffee shop in Borneo. He lived in both the Netherlands and the Sultanate of Oman before returning to Australia at the end of 1998. Edmondson and his sister both attended St. John's Grammar School, in the Adelaide Hills. At the age of 18, Edmondson became the 2nd youngest cyclist ever to be selected for an Australian Olympic Team. With his sister Annette they became the first brother and sister combination to be selected to represent Australia at the same Olympics. For recognition of his achievements Edmondson was awarded a scholarship with the Sport Australia Hall of Fame. In 2013 he won the South Australian Sports Star of the Year award. Previous winners have included Lleyton Hewitt, Donald Bradman and Malcolm Blight. In March 2014 Edmondson competed in the 2014 UCI Track Cycling World Championships in Cali, Colombia winning two World Titles in the individual pursuit and team pursuit. A few months later Edmondson won the gold medal in the team pursuit at the 2014 Commonwealth Games at Glasgow. He is also a dual Junior World Champion where his records still stand today.

Professional career

In January 2015 it was reported in the Adelaide Advertiser that Edmondson had signed his first UCI World Tour contract with Australian road cycling team  for the 2016 and 2017 seasons.

Edmondson believes it's critical that he is a champion both on and off the bike, and has become increasingly involved in community events since he returned from the Olympics. Edmondson volunteers his time at local high schools mentoring and speaking with students encouraging them to get the best out of themselves. He talks about goal setting, pain is a short term hindrance and how important challenging yourself is. He has been a guest speaker at a number of events, including the Australian Cycling Executives (ACE), Cancer Council Breakfast, AOC Talk with a Champ program and also an event called the Faces of the World Dinner for 400 people promoting multiculturalism and strength in diversity within South Australia.

He was named in the start list for the 2017 Giro d'Italia.

Major results

Track

2011
 UCI Junior Track World Championships
1st  Team pursuit
1st  Madison
 National Track Championships
1st  Team pursuit
2nd Madison
3rd Omnium
 2011–12 UCI Track Cycling World Cup, Astana
1st  Madison
2nd  Team pursuit
 3rd  Madison, Oceania Track Championships
2012
 1st  Madison, Oceania Track Championships
 1st  Team pursuit, National Track Championships
 2011–12 UCI Track Cycling World Cup
1st  Team pursuit, London
2nd  Team pursuit, Beijing
2013
 1st  Team pursuit, UCI Track World Championships
 National Track Championships
1st  Points race
1st  Team pursuit
3rd Individual pursuit
2014
 UCI Track World Championships
1st  Individual pursuit
1st  Team pursuit
 Commonwealth Games
1st  Team pursuit
2nd  Individual pursuit
 National Track Championships
1st  Omnium
1st  Madison
1st  Individual pursuit
1st  Team pursuit
2015
 1st  Team pursuit, National Track Championships
 3rd  Team pursuit, UCI Track World Championships
2016
 National Track Championships
1st  Points race
1st  Scratch
1st  Team pursuit
 2nd  Team pursuit, Olympic Games

Road

2014
 1st Stage 6 Tour of Gippsland
2015
 1st Ronde Van Vlaanderen Beloften
 2nd Road race, National Under-23 Road Championships
 9th Overall Paris–Arras Tour
2016
 2nd Dwars door de Vlaamse Ardennen
 3rd  Team time trial, UCI Road World Championships
 3rd Overall Paris–Arras Tour
2018
 1st  Road race, National Road Championships
2019
 1st  Points classification CRO Race
 1st Stage 1 (TTT) Tirreno–Adriatico

Grand Tour general classification results timeline

References

External links
 
 Profile at Cycling Australia
 Profile at Australian Olympic Team
 
 

1993 births
Australian male cyclists
Commonwealth Games gold medallists for Australia
Commonwealth Games silver medallists for Australia
Cyclists at the 2012 Summer Olympics
Cyclists at the 2014 Commonwealth Games
Cyclists at the 2016 Summer Olympics
Living people
Olympic cyclists of Australia
Cyclists from Adelaide
UCI Track Cycling World Champions (men)
Medalists at the 2016 Summer Olympics
Olympic silver medalists for Australia
Olympic medalists in cycling
Commonwealth Games medallists in cycling
Australian track cyclists
People from Miri
21st-century Australian people
Medallists at the 2014 Commonwealth Games